Bar Hefer (born 1995) is an Israel beauty pageant titleholder who was crowned Miss World Israel 2013.

Early life
Bar was born in Petah Tikva and now works as a model in Tel Aviv.

Miss Israel 2013
Bar Hefer is 1st Runner Up Miss Israel (the Israel Maiden of Beauty) at the grand finale of Miss Israel 2013 beauty contest at the Haifa International Convention Center on 27 February 2013. She competed for Miss World 2013.

References

External links
Official Miss Israel 2012 website
Hamoshavot Magazine

1995 births
Living people
Israeli beauty pageant winners